Chrysoblephus puniceus ('golden-eyed purple'), also known as the slinger seabream, is a species of sea bream from southern African waters, ranging from Zavora, Mozambique to Coffee Bay in the Eastern Cape, from the shallows to a depth of 130m. Slingers are the only protogynous hermaphrodite in the Natal area, with females becoming male at approximately 5 years or 38 cm. Subsequently, these now-male individuals can often grow to 55 cm in length. In theory, this reproductive system leads to most offspring being fathered by just a few individuals, which would lead to decreased genetic diversity and inbreeding depression. However, comparisons with the ecologically similar (but gonochoric) santer sea bream indicate similar levels of genetic diversity and effective population size over historic timescales.

It is an important commercial species, making up 25-50% of the total commercial catch in KwaZulu-Natal. Because large individuals are targeted by commercial fishing, and the only males are large, there was growing concern that the stock could be wiped out in the early 1990s, and indeed the stock was severely depleted by fishing by the late 1990s, but has since shown a 30% recovery in biomass.

References

External links
 C. puniceus on fishbase.org

Sparidae
Fish described in 1908